Percosoma is an Australian endemic genus of beetles in the family Carabidae, containing the following species:

 Percosoma asymetricum Fauvel, 1903
 Percosoma carenoides (White, 1846) is often found in southern Tasmanian forests.
 Percosoma sulcipenne Bates, 1878

References

Nothobroscina
Carabidae genera